Michael A. Gorman (July 9, 1950 – December 2, 2012) was a  Republican member of the North Carolina General Assembly representing the state's third House district, including constituents in Craven and Pamlico counties, from 2003 to 2004.

Gorman was born in New Jersey, graduated from the United States Naval Academy, served in the United States Navy with service during Vietnam War and retired as Lieutenant Commander after 24 years of service.

Gorman operated a business in Morehead City and then in Trent Woods, North Carolina. He lost a primary challenge in 2004, and lost another primary in 2006. He also served as mayor of Trent Woods.

He died of POEMS syndrome in 2012.

Notes

External links

Mayors of places in North Carolina
Members of the North Carolina House of Representatives
People from Craven County, North Carolina
People from Morehead City, North Carolina
United States Navy officers
United States Navy personnel of the Vietnam War
United States Naval Academy alumni
Neurological disease deaths in the United States
2012 deaths
1950 births
21st-century American politicians